The Abduction from the Seraglio is a 1961 Australian TV version of Mozart's opera Die Entführung aus dem Serail and sung in English. It was one of a number of operas broadcast by the ABC in the early days of Australian television.

Cast
Rae Cocking as Constanze
Rosalind Keene as Blonde
Alan Light as Pasha Selim
Donald Smith as Belmonte
Neil Warren-Smith as Osmin
Gino Zancanaro as Pedrillo

Reception
The critic for The Sydney Morning Herald thought "it would be hard to pick a more unsuitable opera for television" than The Abduction from the Seraglio due to the length of the arias and lack of movement. But he felt the production was "handsome and remarkable" which proved that "no opera can be presumed unfit for television, provided the delight in visual ingenuities is matched by a genuine appreciation of its purely musical opportunities."

References

External links

Australian television plays
Australian television plays based on operas
Australian black-and-white films
Films based on operas by Wolfgang Amadeus Mozart
Australian Broadcasting Corporation original programming
Films directed by Alan Burke (director)
1960s English-language films